The 2019–20 A-League, also known as the 2019–20 Hyundai A-League for sponsorship reasons, was the 43rd season of national level soccer in Australia, and the 15th since the establishment of the A-League in 2004. The regular season commenced on 11 October 2019 and was scheduled to conclude on 26 April 2020, though was postponed to 19 August 2020 as a result of the COVID-19 pandemic. The pandemic caused Football Federation Australia (FFA) to suspend the season from late March to mid July. The season resumed on 17 July 2020, which meant the finals occurred in mid-August and the Grand Final was held on 30 August 2020.

Sydney FC were the defending champions and Perth Glory were the defending premiers.

Clubs 
The league has been expanded to eleven teams, with the addition of the Western United starting their first season.

Personnel and kits

1. Away kit.

Managerial changes

Foreign players 

The following do not fill a Visa position:
1Those players who were born and started their professional career abroad but have since gained Australian citizenship (or New Zealand citizenship, in the case of Wellington Phoenix);
2Australian citizens (or New Zealand citizens, in the case of Wellington Phoenix) who have chosen to represent another national team;
3Injury Replacement Players, or National Team Replacement Players;
4Guest Players (eligible to play a maximum of fourteen games);
5Players who left at the end of their contract, which was originally at the end of the season, but became mid-season due to the COVID-19 pandemic in Australia extending the season

Salary cap exemptions and captains

Transfers

Regular season

Effects of the 2019–20 COVID-19 pandemic
Due to the self isolation requirements after overseas travel imposed by the Australian Government on 16 March, both Melbourne Victory and Wellington Phoenix were required to self-isolate having returned from playing in Wellington on 15 March 2020. This led to four games involving both clubs being postponed. 

On 16 March 2020, due to restrictions imposed by the Australian Government of gatherings involving more than 500 people, the FFA announced that the remainder of the season would proceed with all games being played behind closed doors. Wellington Phoenix had intended to relocate for the remainder of the season in Sydney in order to keep playing the remainder of its scheduled games. The season was suspended on 24 March.

The season resumed on 17 July 2020, with almost all of the remaining 27 matches in the regular season played in New South Wales.

League table

Results

Finals series

Elimination-finals

Semi-finals

Grand Final

Statistics

Attendances

By club
These are the attendance records of each of the teams at the end of the home and away season. The table does not include finals series attendances.

By round

Club membership

Player stats

Top scorers
Including Finals matches

Hat-tricks

Own goals

Clean sheets
Including Finals matches

Awards
The NAB Young Footballer of the Year Award will be awarded to the finest performance of an under-23 player from Australia or New Zealand throughout the season.

Monthly awards

Annual awards
The following end of the season awards were announced at the 2019–20 Dolan Warren Awards night on 10 September 2020.
 Johnny Warren Medal – Alessandro Diamanti, Western United
 NAB Young Footballer of the Year – Riley McGree, Adelaide United
 Nike Golden Boot Award – Jamie Maclaren, Melbourne City (22 goals)
 Goalkeeper of the Year – Andrew Redmayne, Sydney FC
 Coach of the Year – Erick Mombaerts, Melbourne City
 Fair Play Award – Sydney FC
 Referee of the Year – Chris Beath
 Goal of the Year – Nikolai Topor-Stanley, Newcastle Jets (Newcastle Jets v Perth Glory, 29 February 2020)

See also

 2019–20 Adelaide United FC season
 2019–20 Brisbane Roar FC season
 2019–20 Central Coast Mariners FC season
 2019–20 Melbourne City FC season
 2019–20 Melbourne Victory FC season
 2019–20 Newcastle Jets FC season
 2019–20 Perth Glory FC season
 2019–20 Sydney FC season
 2019–20 Wellington Phoenix FC season
 2019–20 Western Sydney Wanderers FC season
 2019–20 Western United FC season

Notes

References

 
1
1
A-League, 2019–2020
A-League Men seasons